The Orlov Trotter (also known as Orlov; Russian: орловский рысак) is a horse breed with a hereditary fast trot, noted for its outstanding speed and stamina. It is the most famous Russian horse. The breed was developed in Russia in the late 18th century by Count Alexei Orlov at his Khrenovskoy stud farm near the town of Bobrov (Voronezh Guberniya). The Orlovs emerged as the result of crossing various European mares (primarily of English, Dutch, Mecklenburg, and Danish breeding) with Arabian stallions.

During the 19th century, Orlov trotters were used mainly for riding and harness racing by Russian nobility. They were valued for their beauty and elegance combined with the ability to work hard. They were also used for the improvement of other Russian horses.  When harness racing became widespread at the end of the century, the Orlovs faced intense competition from American-developed Standardbreds, who are generally recognized as less refined but faster than Orlov trotters. Eventually Standardbred stallions were crossed with Orlov mares and a new breed, the Russian Trotter, appeared. The possibility of the extinction of the Orlovs was a concern in the 20th century because of crossbreeding and the Soviet disregard of horse-raising. However, the breed survived, and today fifteen stud farms in Russia and Ukraine raise pure-blooded Orlov Trotters.

Development of the breed

The land that became Orlov's Khrenovsky stud farm was given to him by Catherine II (Catherine the Great) as a reward for his participation in the coup d'etat which brought her to the throne. The buildings were constructed by Giovanni Giliardi. The original estate was very large; the modern Khrenovsky stud area is fifteen times smaller than it was prior to the Bolshevik revolution.

The ancestor of all Orlov Trotters was the purebred grey Arabian stallion Smetanka. Orlov bought him in Turkey for the enormous sum of 60,000 rubles.  Although he died the next year, he lived to sire five offspring. Among others he was crossed with Isabelline, a Danish mare from the Frederiksborg royal stud-farm, who foaled a stallion that was named Polkan (1778–1793).

Polkan was crossed with a Dutch mare which, in 1784, produced the grey stallion Bars I (1784–1808), considered the first Orlov trotter. He was 162.5 cm high at the withers which made him taller than most contemporary trotters, possessed a fast trotting gait and featured the beauty and noble bearing which would later distinguish the newly created breed. For seventeen years Bars I was crossed with different mares and sired eleven stallions that carried his distinguishing characteristics.  The emergence of the breed was the result of a thorough and elaborate selection process. About 3,000 horses kept at the stud were involved. Unlike many other Russian nobles who were fond of horse-raising, Orlov was a professional breeder who is also credited for creating some seventy different animal breeds including the Russian wolfhound.

Orlov was very protective of his bloodstock, and would sell only geldings (castrated stallions). Even when Tsar Alexander I asked Orlov to sell him several stallions, Orlov only agreed to sell geldings. This rule was maintained for twenty years after Orlov's death. Later, when the Khrenovsky stud farm belonged to the Russian Crown, Trotters were then openly sold to private stud-owners.

Orlov trotters in the 19th century

In 1809, the Khrenovsky stud-farm was inherited by Orlov's daughter Anna. Until 1831 Orlov's disciple, the former serf Vasily Shishkin, continued to develop the breed. However, in 1831, he left the Khrenovsky stud-farm and founded his own. Orlov's daughter lacked her father's competence in horse-breeding and the Khrenovsky stud-farm went downhill. Trotters were intensively crossed with various European breeds in order to increase their dimensions and their quality fell.  In 1845, the stud-farm passed into the hands of the Crown, but for some time this only made matters worse. It was able to regain its fame only some decades later. In 1881, the Khrenovsky stud-farm stopped raising all breeds except for Orlov trotters.  The best Orlov trotters were now raised in private stud-farms such as the Shishkin's.

In 1834, a Trotting Society was established in Moscow, and regular races began.  Orlov trotters had already proved to be the best racing horses in Russia and soon they proved to be the best in Europe. In 1867, Orlov trotter Beduin made headlines when, at World's Fair in Paris, it covered 3500 feet in 1 minute 32 seconds – 4 seconds ahead the fastest Standardbred mare, Flora Temple. Since then many trotters have been sold abroad where they greatly contributed to the creation of local trotting breeds. Meanwhile, in the US, Standardbreds were gradually improved until they were able to outrace Orlov trotters. In 1877, harness racing totalisator emerged in Russia and this led to crucial changes in breeding Orlovs. Many stud-farmers turned to raising racing horses who were not as large and hard-working or as beautiful and elegant as traditional Orlov trotters. Since Standardbreds were, in general, faster than Orlov trotters, these breeds were intensively crossed. The resulting breed was called Russian trotters and they lacked many distinctive features of Orlov trotters. They were smaller and lighter and were not capable of doing as much work as Orlov trotters. In order to prevent Orlov trotters from disappearing through mixing with Standardbreds, the government introduced separate races for Orlov trotters and Standardbreds. Finally Russian stud-farmers managed to improve the racing performance of Orlov trotters. Stallion Krepysh born in 1904 won 55 races and covered 1 mile for 2 minutes 8.5 seconds.  He was the fastest trotter in pre-revolutionary Russia.  Krepysh and most of his issue died during the Russian civil war.

In the Soviet Union

The Civil war was a major disaster for horse breeding in Russia.  Many horses died in battle, yet more were eaten for food, and there was a general collapse of the economy, making horse breeding a luxury few could afford. However, after 1920, the raising of Orlov Trotters resumed and crossbreeding was forbidden. At that time, Orlov trotters were used primarily for farming and transport due to their physical strength and outstanding working abilities. By the 1930s, race breeding had also been reestablished and pre-revolutionary racing records were being broken. Arguably, the Orlovs reached their second heyday in the 1930s.

During World War II, also known as the Soviet-German war, the number of Orlov Trotters again decreased. After the war, the state acutely needed horses in order to restore agricultural production. Due to their working ability and high productivity, Orlov trotters were again widely used to improve local horses. However, by 1953, the Soviet authorities decided that, in part due to increased use of the tractor, horse-raising was not important for the economy. This resulted in reduction of the number of stud farms and less governmental support of those that remained.

Today

After the fall of the Soviet Union, the future of the breed seemed unclear since rich Russians interested in harness racing preferred the faster Russian and American trotters. Therefore, in 1997, the International Committee for the Protection of the Orlov Trotter was established. Purebred Orlov trotters are now raised on twelve stud farms in Russia and three in Ukraine. The studs in Russia have a total of about 800 mares, which raises some concern; it is a general rule that a horse breed with fewer than 1000 female individuals is in danger.

Breed Characteristics
The Orlov trotters are in general taller and more robust than Standardbreds. The average current measurements for Orlov breeding stallions are 161.4 cm (height at withers), 164 cm (body length/barrel), 186 cm (chest circumference), 20.4 cm (cannon bone circumference) and for breeding mares are 160.3 cm, 163.6 cm, 186.2 cm and 20.1 cm respectively. In appearance, the Orlovs are characterized by a big head, large expressive eyes, a long and naturally arched neck set high, prominent withers and broad croup. The body is muscular. The legs are strongly built, with prominent joints and clearly defined tendons.

Due to its Arabian origins, many Orlovs are grey, at maturity, though all are born a darker colour at birth.  (Grey horses are born dark and slowly lighten as they age until their hair coat is completely white.) At maturity, the colors of Orlovs are: grey (46%), black (28%), bay (20%) or chestnut (5%).

See also
List of horse breeds
Smetanka
Orlov (disambiguation)
Kholstomer — an Orlov trotter who recounts his life in Leo Tolstoy's story

References
 
Витт В.О. Из истории русского коннозаводства. Создание новых пород лошадей на рубеже XVIII-XIX столетий. Moscow, 1952.
Рождественская Г. Орловский рысак. Moscow, 2003. .

External links
The Orlov trotter (archived)
Oklahoma State University page on the Orlov trotter
Additional Orlov trotter information

Orlov trotter
Horse breeds originating in Russia
Harness racing